Deepstaria is a genus of jellyfish known for their thin, sheet-like bodies. The genus is named after the Deep Star 4000, which collected the holotype of the type species, D. enigmatica.

Description
Characteristic features of this genus include: a large, thin umbrella, lack of tentacles, and long oral arms.

Species list
, WoRMS recognizes two species within the genus:
Deepstaria enigmatica 
Deepstaria reticulum

References

External links
 Video of Deepstaria from an EV Nautilus expedition.

Ulmaridae
Scyphozoan genera